Enbridge Inc. is a multinational pipeline and energy company headquartered in Calgary, Alberta, Canada. Enbridge owns and operates pipelines throughout Canada and the United States, transporting crude oil, natural gas, and natural gas liquids. Enbridge's pipeline system is the longest in North America and the largest oil export pipeline network in the world. Its crude oil system consists of 28,661 kilometres (17,809 miles) of pipelines. Its 38,300 kilometre (23,800 mile) natural gas pipeline system connects multiple Canadian provinces, several US states, and the Gulf of Mexico. The company was formed by Imperial Oil in 1949 as the Interprovincial Pipe Line Company Limited to transport Alberta oil to refineries. Over time, it has grown through acquisition of other existing pipeline companies and the expansion of their projects. Between 2012 and 2021, Enbridge transported over 32 billion barrels of crude oil.

Enbridge has built several renewable energy projects in North America and Europe including wind, solar, hydroelectric, and geothermal and has proposed a net zero greenhouse gas emission target for 2050. Enbridge is ranked 144th on the 2022 Forbes Global 2000, and 418th on the 2022 Fortune Global 500 List. Enbridge has been responsible for several oil spills, including a spill on line 3, which was the largest inland oil spill in the US. Opposition to Enbridge projects has resulted in several popular uprisings, most notably the Dakota Access Pipeline protests, and the Stop line 3 protests.

History
The company was initially incorporated by Imperial Oil as Interprovincial Pipe Line Company (IPL) on April 30, 1949, after Canada's first major oil discovery, in 1947, at Leduc, Alberta. In the same year, the company built its first oil pipeline from Leduc to Regina, Saskatchewan. In 1950, it was expanded through Gretna, Manitoba, to Superior, Wisconsin, in the United States. To operate the United States portion of the pipeline, the Lakehead Pipe Line Company (now Enbridge Energy Partners) was created. In 1953, the pipeline was expanded to Sarnia, Ontario, and in 1956 to Toronto and Buffalo, New York.

In 1953, IPL was listed on the Toronto and Montreal stock exchanges. In 1983, IPL built the Norman Wells pipeline and joined Frontier Pipeline Company. In 1986, through a series of stakes exchanges, IPL gained control of Home Oil and in 1988, it changed its name to Interhome Energy Inc. In 1991, it changed its name to Interprovincial Pipe Line Inc.

In 1992, Interprovincial Pipe Line Inc. was acquired by Interprovincial Pipe Line System Inc., which changed its name to IPL Energy Inc. in 1994, after the acquisition of Consumers' Gas (now Enbridge Gas Inc.) and diversification into the gas distribution business.  In addition, it acquired stakes in AltaGas Services and the electric utility of Cornwall, Ontario. Through the 1990s, the company expanded its gas pipeline network and acquired a stake in the Chicap oil pipeline. It also built the Athabasca Pipeline from northeastern Alberta to the main pipeline system. In 1995, the company expanded its activities outside of North America by taking a stake in the Ocensa pipeline. This stake was sold in 2009.  IPL Energy became Enbridge Inc in 1998.  The Enbridge name is a portmanteau from "energy" and "bridge".

In the 2000s, Enbridge introduced several large projects. Enbridge made their first investment into renewable energy in 2002 with the purchase of a wind farm, and since then has been consistently making efforts to become a leader in renewable energy in Canada. In 2006, it announced the Enbridge Northern Gateway Pipelines Project from Athabasca to Kitimat, British Columbia.  The same year, it announced the Alberta Clipper pipeline project from Hardisty, Alberta to Superior, Wisconsin, to connect oil sands production area with the existing network. This pipeline became operational in 2010.

In 2009, Enbridge bought the Sarnia Photovoltaic Power Plant and expanded it up to 80 MW, which was the world's largest photovoltaic power station at that time.

In January 2017, Enbridge acquired Midcoast Energy Partners for $170 million in cash, and later in 2018, ArcLight acquired Midcoast Operating, L.P. from Enbridge for $1.1 billion.

Enbridge released its first annual sustainability report in 2001, and in November 2020, Enbridge expanded its environmental, social and governance (ESG) goals and targets. The company aims to achieve net-zero greenhouse gas emissions by 2050, with an interim target to reduce emissions intensity by 35% by 2030. That same year, President and CEO Al Monaco said that renewable power is now "the fourth Enbridge platform." Enbridge's ESG goals also aim to diversify its workforce with 28% representation from racial and ethnic groups and 40% from women by 2025.  

In 2021, Enbridge was recognized as one of Canada's top 100 employers for the 18th time, and as one of Canada's best diversity employers for the seventh time.

Merger with Spectra Energy
On September 6, 2016, Enbridge agreed to buy Spectra Energy in an all-stock deal valued at about $28 billion.
Spectra, headquartered in Houston, Texas, operated in three key areas of the natural gas industry: transmission and storage, distribution, and gathering and processing.  Spectra was formed in late 2006 as a spin-off from Duke Energy.  Spectra owned the Texas Eastern Pipeline (TETCo), a major natural gas pipeline transporting gas from the Gulf of Mexico coast in Texas to the New York City area; TETCo was one of the largest pipeline systems in the United States. Spectra also operated three oil pipelines, numerous other gas pipelines and was proposing to build still 3 more gas pipelines in the U.S. The merger was completed on February 27, 2017.

Operations

Crude oil and liquids pipelines
The company is the largest transporter of crude oil in Canada with 3 million barrels per day of oil and liquids. The Enbridge Pipeline System is the world's longest crude oil and liquids pipeline system, with 27,564 km (17,127 mi) of active crude pipeline in both Canada and the United States. This pipeline network delivers 3 million barrels of oil per day.

Enbridge delivered more than 3.77 billion barrels of crude oil in 2020, and more than 29.5 billion barrels over the past decade, from 2011 through 2020 inclusive.

Enbridge has several new capacities and expansion projects, including the expansion of the Alberta Clipper, replacing of Line 6B, reversal of Line 9 and others.  Its Light Oil Market Access initiative is a project to deliver light crude oil from North Dakota and Western Canada to refineries in Ontario, Quebec, and the U.S. Midwest. Eastern Access, including a reversal of Line 9, is a project to deliver oil to Western Canada and Bakken to refineries in Eastern Canada and the midwest and eastern U.S.  Western Gulf Coast Access, including reversal and expansion of the Seaway Pipeline and the Flanagan South Pipeline, is a plan to connect Canadian heavy oil supply to refineries along the Gulf Coast of the United States.

Enbridge's oil pipelines cross North America, with 13,833 km (8,672 mi) of active pipe in the United States and 13,681 km (8500 mi) of active pipe in Canada. The list below outlines eight of those lines.

 Line 1 is a 1,767 km (1,098 mi) pipeline that starts in Enbridge's Edmonton Terminal in Alberta, and runs to its Superior Terminal in Wisconsin. On average, this pipeline delivers 237,000 barrels of light crude, natural gas liquids, and refined products daily.
 Line 2A is a 966 km (600 mi) pipeline that runs from an Enbridge terminal in Edmonton, Alberta, to its Cromer Terminal in Manitoba. On average, per day this pipeline carries 442,000 barrels of condensates, light crude, and heavy crude. Line 2B is an 808 km (502 mi) pipeline that runs from the same Cromer Terminal to the Superior Terminal in Wisconsin. That pipeline delivers on average 442,000 barrels of light crude oil per day.
 Line 3 is a 1,769 km (1,099 mi) pipeline that runs from the Edmonton terminal to the Superior Terminal. Over half (1,070 km) of the pipeline is located in Canada, between Alberta and Manitoba. Per day, the pipeline transports an average of 390,000 barrels of light, medium and heavy crude oil. 
 Line 4 is a 1,722 km (1,101 mi) crude oil pipeline starting at the Edmonton terminal to the Superior terminal. This pipeline carries, on average, 390,000 barrels of light, medium and heavy crude oil per day.
 Line 5 is a 1,038 km (645 mi) crude oil pipeline running from the Superior terminal in Wisconsin to Sarnia, Ontario. On average, this pipeline moves 540,000 barrels of natural gas liquids and light crude oil per day. 
 Alberta clipper Pipeline (Line 67) is a 1,790 km (1,112 mi) pipeline that runs from Hardisty, Alberta to Superior, Wisconsin. An average of 800,000 barrels of heavy crude oil is moved through this pipeline per day. 
 Southern Lights Pipeline (Line 13) is a 2,560 km (1,591 mi) pipeline that runs from Manhattan, Illinois to the Edmonton terminal. This pipeline carries on average, 180,000 barrels of diluent per day.

Natural gas pipelines

Enbridge's pipelines transport 20% of the natural gas consumed in the United States. It owns and operates Canada's largest natural gas distribution network, providing distribution services in Ontario and Quebec. Union Gas in Ontario now fully operates under Enbridge Gas Inc. In Quebec, Enbridge has interest ownership in Gazifère.

Enbridge builds, owns and operates a network of natural gas transmission pipelines across North America, connecting the continent's prolific natural gas supply to major markets in Canada, the United States, Mexico, and further abroad.

Enbridge's natural gas network currently covers 38,375 km (23,850 mi) across five Canadian provinces, 30 U.S. states, and offshore in the Gulf of Mexico, transporting roughly 16.2 Bcf (billions of cubic feet per day) of natural gas.

Canadian gas transmission: major assets 

 B.C. Pipeline (2.9 Bcf/d): this pipeline system runs from Fort Nelson in northeastern British Columbia to the U.S. border at Huntington-Sumas stretching 2,858 km (1,776 mi). It transports 60 percent of all natural gas produced in B.C., and provides natural gas service to the province as well as US states including Oregon, Idaho, and Washington.
 Alliance Pipeline (1.6bcf/d): running 3,848 km (2,391 mi) from northern British Columbia across the U.S.-Canada border to Aux Sable gas processing plant in Chicago, Illinois. Enbridge owns 50 percent of the Alliance Pipeline and 42% of the Aux Sable processing facility.

U.S. gas transmission: major assets 

 Algonquin Gas Transmission (3.12 Bcf/d): this pipeline is 1,129 miles long, and transports natural gas to markets in New York, New Jersey, and New England.
 East Tennessee (1.86 Bcf/d): a natural gas pipeline 1,526 miles long, extending from Tennessee to the Southeast and Mid-Atlantic states, ending in Virginia.
 Maritimes & Northeast Pipeline: this pipeline was constructed to bring natural gas produced in Atlantic Canada through to other Canadian provinces (Nova Scotia and New Brunswick), and into U.S. states (Main, New Hampshire, and Massachusetts). 
 NEXUS Gas Transmission: measuring 257 miles long, this pipeline supplies natural gas markets in the U.S. Midwest and the Dawn Hub in Ontario. This is a 50/50 joint partnership between Enbridge and DTE Energy. 
 Sabal Trail: carries natural gas via a 287 mile pipeline to the U.S. Southeast. This is a joint partnership between Enbridge, NextEra Energy and Duke Energy.
Southeast Supply Header (SESH) (1.09 Bcf/d): a natural gas pipeline 287 miles in length, connecting gas supply in Texas and Louisiana to other natural gas markets in the Southeast US.
Texas Eastern (11.69 Bcf/d): delivers natural gas from Texas and the Gulf Coast through 8.83 miles of pipeline to markets in the Northeastern UW including New York, Boston, and Pittsburgh. 
Valley Crossing Pipeline (2.6 Bcf/d): placed into service in November 2018, this pipeline moves Texas sourced natural gas to a Mexico State-owned power utility, the Comision Federal de Electricidad (CFE).
Vector Pipeline: this pipeline acts as a connector for other pipelines including the Alliance pipeline and NEXUS Gas Transmission to the Union Gas Dawn Hub.

DCP Midstream 
DCP Midstream is a joint venture between Enbridge and Phillips 66. Phillips 66 is one of the largest petroleum services companies in the US, owning and operating 39 natural gas plants and 51,000 miles of gathering pipe. Headquartered in Denver, Colorado, DCP operates a portfolio of natural gas gathering, logistics, marketing and processing services across nine states.

Renewable energy generation 
Enbridge made its first investment into renewable energy in 2002 with the purchase of a wind farm. To date Enbridge has invested in 23 wind farms, 7 solar energy projects, 5 waste heat recovery facilities, 1 geothermal project, 1 power transmission project and 1 hydroelectric facilitiy.

Enbridge has a growing interest in European offshore wind energy, and its renewable assets are part of the company's plan to achieve net-zero emissions by 2050.

In 2020, President and CEO Al Monaco said that renewable power is now "the fourth Enbridge platform."

Power transmission
In February, 2020, Enbridge sold its shares of Montana-Alberta Tie-Line (MATL) to Berkshire Hathaway Energy. The MATL project is a 300-megawatt (MW), 230-kilovolt (kV) electrical transmission line allowing movement of power between Alberta and Montana. The MATL project, which was placed in service the fall of 2013, supports ongoing development of a rich wind-powered generation resource and allows electrical energy to flow in both directions. The transmission line is 210 miles (345 km) long and runs between the Lethbridge, Alberta area and the Great Falls, Montana area. Roughly one third of the line is in Canada and two thirds in the U.S.

Natural gas utility 
Enbridge Gas Inc. was formed on January 1, 2019 with the combination of Enbridge Gas Distribution and Union Gas. Its network consists of 5,471 km of gas transmission lines, 66,787 km of gas distribution service lines, and 78,214 km of gas distribution main lines.

They deliver to over 15 million people in Ontario and Quebec through 3.8 million residential, commercial, industrial, and institutional meter connections and distribute roughly 2.3 bcf/d of natural gas. Additionally, in southwestern Ontario they have the largest integrated underground storage facility in Canada, and one of North America's top natural gas trading hubs.

Enbridge's natural gas distribution also includes interest ownership in two additional natural gas distributors. This includes Gazfiére, serving people in Outaouais region of Quebec, and Ènergir LP, a company that operates gas transmission, gas distribution, and power distribution throughout Quebec and Vermont.

Oil spills and violations 
Enbridge's pipeline was responsible for the largest inland oil spill in the United States in 1991, when 1.7 million gallons of oil ruptured from a buried pipeline in Grand Rapids, Minnesota, spilling crude into a wetland and a tributary of the Mississippi River.

Using data from Enbridge's own reports, the Polaris Institute calculated that 804 spills occurred on Enbridge pipelines between 1999 and 2010.

On July 4, 2002, an Enbridge pipeline ruptured in a marsh near the town of Cohasset, Minnesota, in Itasca County, spilling  of crude oil.

In 2006, there were 67 reportable spills totaling  on Enbridge's energy and transportation and distribution system; in 2007 there were 65 reportable spills totalling . According to Enbridge, roughly half the oil was recovered.

On January 1, 2007, an Enbridge pipeline that runs from Superior, Wisconsin to near Whitewater, Wisconsin cracked open and spilled ~ of crude oil onto farmland and into a drainage ditch. The same pipeline was struck by construction crews on February 2, 2007, in Rusk County, Wisconsin, spilling ~ of crude, of which about 87,000 gallons were recovered.

On January 2, 2010, Enbridge's Line 2 ruptured near Neche, North Dakota, releasing about 3,784 barrels of crude oil, of which 2,237 barrels were recovered. This oil leaked into the Boghill Creek, which eventually connects to the Assiniboine River.

A United States Environmental Protection Agency update of the Kalamazoo River spill concluded the pipeline rupture "caused the largest inland oil spill in Midwest history" and reported the cost of the cleanup at $36.7 million (US) as of November 14, 2011. PHMSA raised concerns in a Corrective Action Order (CAO) about numerous anomalies that had been detected on this pipeline by internal line inspection tools, yet Enbridge had failed to check a number of those anomalies in the field. The National Transportation Safety Board said at $800 million, it was the costliest onshore spill cleanup in U.S. history. The NTSB found Enbridge knew of a defect in the pipeline five years before it burst. In June 2013, a Kalamazoo man lodged himself into an Enbridge pipeline in Marshall, MI to protest Enbridge's lack of accountability for the 2010 spill and to encourage landowners along Enbridge's Line 6B expansion to offer increased resistance to construction in 2013. In 2014, Enbridge completed cleanup of the river per the EPA's order.

On September 9, 2010, a broken water line caused a rupture on Enbridge's Line 6A pipeline near Romeoville, Illinois, released an estimate  of oil into the surrounding area.

The 17-kilometre-long, 12-inch diameter pipe was constructed in 2006 and links the Long Lake oilsands upgrader to the Cheetham terminal as part of Enbridge's Athabasca system. Unusually heavy rainfall in the region, also responsible for the 2013 Alberta floods, may have caused "ground movement on the right-of way that may have impacted the pipeline." Enbridge's Athabasca (Line 19) shares a portion of right of way with Line 37 and Enbridge's Wood Buffalo/Waupisoo (Line 75/18) which also shares a portion of right of way with Line 37, a major part of the network that serves Alberta's oilsands, were closed down as a precautionary measure. Operations between Hardisty and Cheecham were restored on June 23 when Enbridge's Athabasca pipeline (Line 19) was restored to service.

On July 1, 2013, WWMT News in Michigan reported that the Michigan Department of Environmental Quality had issued a citation against Enbridge for contamination of North Ore Creek by an Enbridge pipeline maintenance activity.

On January 30, 2017, a road crew in Texas punctured the Seaway S-1 crude oil pipeline, which is jointly owned by Enterprise Products Partners and Enbridge through the joint venture Seaway Crude Pipeline Company. Two days later, it was unclear how much oil had spilled over the nearby Highway 121 northeast of Dallas. After the incident, supply concerns reportedly helped push "oil prices 2% higher in early trading to nearly $54 a barrel."

On October 9, 2018, Enbridge's Westcoast Pipeline exploded in Shelley, British Columbia, sparking a massive fireball and leading to shortages of natural gas throughout British Columbia.

Protests
In May 2012, West Coast First Nations members and supporters protested near Enbridge's Annual Shareholder's meeting, against the proposed Northern Gateway Project and on May 31, 2012, the Vancouver Observer reported about 40 protesters outside the Canadian Oil and Gas Export Summit, protesting the proposed Enbridge Northern Gateway Project.

On July 17, 2012, a group calling itself "We are the Kalamazoo" protested against Enbridge's response to the Kalamazoo spill and its plans to construct the line 6B pipeline.  This protest was on the second anniversary of the Kalamazoo spill.

On November 12, 2012, the Lansing State Journal reported that the head of the Line 6B Pipeline project stated that he had never seen as much organized landowner resistance despite 30 years in the pipeline industry. They noted that this was probably because of the 2010 Kalamazoo River spill.

In May 2013, Hamilton area residents protested the reversal of flow in Line 9 and temporarily closed Ontario Highway 6. Later that year, on June 6, 2013, a group called Hamilton 350 sent a letter of complaint to the Hamilton (Ontario) police service (HPS) for accepting over $44,000 in donations from Enbridge. The letter questions whether police officers would be impartial during any anti-Enbridge protests, given the donation.

On June 26, 2013, Hamilton Police arrested at least 10 people who occupied an Enbridge compound for six days to protest the expansion of Enbridge's Line 9 and intent to ship diluted bitumen through the line.

On July 22, 2013, a group of protesters locked themselves to equipment at an Enbridge pipeline construction site in Stockbridge, Michigan. Protesters stated that they had to take matters into their own hands given that state regulators were failing the public, "We felt that there was no other option."

A September 16, 2013, "Inside Climate News" report by journalist David Hasemeyer describes how many Michigan landowners are concerned about the safety of new Enbridge pipeline being laid within a few feet of their homes, and the lack of regulations for how close a pipeline can be constructed to an existing home. The article quotes Richard Kuprewicz, President of an engineering consulting company and an adviser to Pipeline Hazardous Materials Administration: "Clearly the pipeline safety regulations aren't adequate in this area and the siting regulations aren't adequate," Kuprewicz said. "It's a bad combination."

In September 2016, a group of Native Americans protested the construction of the Dakota Access Pipeline, which Enbridge had announced plans to acquire a portion of in a $2 billion deal.

In November 2020, Michigan Governor Gretchen Whitmer revoked a 1953 easement for an Enbridge pipeline connecting two parts of the Great Lakes through the Straits of Mackinac.

In June 2021, Enbridge resumed construction on the Line 3 replacement project in Northern Minnesota after taking a brief planned break. Enbridge's plans to expand its Line 3 pipeline in Minnesota along a new route have been met with prolonged resistance from Native communities and activists calling themselves water protectors.

In January 2022, a group of about 400 met in front of a Bank of America location in Austin to protest Enbridge's plans to expand the Moda Ingleside Energy Center onto historic Karankawa land in Corpus Christi, Texas.

Technology and innovation 
Enbridge has two Technology + Innovation labs. In January 2019, the first lab opened in Calgary, Alberta. In April 2019, the second lab opened in Houston, Texas. The labs use industrial predictive algorithms, machine learning, and sentiment analysis to find efficiencies within the company and help improve safety and reliability of their pipeline infrastructure.

The labs have developed ways to get sensor data from pipelines, helping to improve flows of natural gas and crude oil terminals. Additionally, the labs have helped enhance pipeline leak detection, and ensure better maintenance schedules. For renewable energy projects, the labs have developed different ways to reposition wind turbine blades to help maximize wind power generation.

Financials 
Dollar amounts in millions of Canadian dollars unless otherwise noted, with the exception of employee numbers. Additionally, earnings are after income tax and unadjusted.

Leadership

Chairman of the Board 
David G. Waldon, 1977–1978
vacant, 1978–1985
Robert K. Heule, 1985–1989
Richard F. Haskayne, 1989–1991
H. Gordon MacNeill, 1991–1996
Donald J. Taylor, 1996–2005
David A. Arledge, 2005–2017
Gregory L. Ebel, 2017–

President 
Dr Oliver B. Hopkins, 1949–1951
T. S. Johnston, 1951–1967
David G. Waldon, 1967–1977
Robert K. Heule, 1977–1985
G. Edward Courtnage, 1985–1986
Richard F. Haskayne, 1987–1991
Brian F. MacNeill, 1991–2000
Patrick D. Daniel, 2000–2012
Albert Monaco, 2012–2023
Gregory L. Ebel, 2023–

See also

Enbridge Gas New Brunswick
Enbridge Line 5
Enbridge Northern Gateway Pipelines
Enbridge Pipelines
Nautilus Pipeline

References

External links

 
 Enbridge Asset Map (current)

 
Companies based in Calgary
Companies listed on the New York Stock Exchange
Companies listed on the Toronto Stock Exchange
Natural gas companies of Canada
Natural gas pipeline companies
Oil companies of Canada
Oil pipeline companies
S&P/TSX 60
Canadian companies established in 1949
Energy companies established in 1949